Isabelle Mergault (born 11 May 1958) is a French actress, director, writer and television/radio personality.

Personal life
Isabelle Mergault was born in Aubervilliers, Seine-Saint-Denis near Paris.

Filmography

Actress

Director / writer

Theater

Radio/television

References

External links

1958 births
Living people
People from Aubervilliers
French women film directors
20th-century French actresses